Rudolf Baláž (20 November 1940 in Nevoľné – 27 July 2011 in Banská Bystrica) was a Slovak Bishop of the Roman Catholic Diocese of Banská Bystrica from 1990 until his death in 2011. Baláž was ordained as a Catholic priest on 23 June 1963. He died on 27 July 2011 at the age of 70.

References

1940 births
2011 deaths
20th-century Roman Catholic bishops in Slovakia
People from Žiar nad Hronom District
21st-century Roman Catholic bishops in Slovakia